Salon Palloilijat (abbreviated SalPa) is a sports club from Salo in Finland.  The club is popularly known as  The Swans.  SalPa was formed in 1956 and their home ground is at the Salon Urheilupuisto.  The men's football first team currently plays in the Kakkonen (Second Division).  The Chairman of SalPa is Toni Tammi.

The club currently has sections covering football, floorball, figure skating and basketball.

Background

Salon Palloilijat was established in 1956 and the club's first taste of success was in 1960 when the gained promotion to the Suomisarjaa (Finland League) which at that time was the second tier of Finnish football.  Their success at this level was short-lived but just over forty years later in 2001 they played one season in the Ykkönen (First Division) which is the current second tier.

SalPa have had four periods covering 25 seasons in the Kakkonen (Second Division), the third tier of Finnish football from 1978 to 1979, 1982–90, 1996–2000 and 2002 to the current day.

The club's highest attendance is 2,984 spectators (SalPa-Futistähdet 21.6.1999).  The largest attendance for a league match is 835 spectators (SalPa-AC Vantaa, 2001, Ykkönen – First Division).

SalPa have historically invested heavily in youth activities and continues to provide a thriving junior section.

Season to season

Club Structure

SalPa currently has 1 men's team, 1 ladies teams, 7 boys teams and 7 girls team.  The club organises various activities for its young players including skill and ability schools, tournaments and futsal.

References and sources
Official Website
First Team Website
Salon Palloilijat Juniorit Website
Finnish Wikipedia
Suomen Cup
 Salon Palloilijat Facebook

Footnotes

 
Football clubs in Finland
Salo, Finland
1956 establishments in Finland